Nic Chagall (born Claus Terhoeven; 10 November 1972 in Krefeld, North Rhine-Westphalia, Germany ) is a German trance music producer and DJ best known for being one half of the German trance duo Cosmic Gate. He also co-founded Essential Cuts Studio in Duisburg, Germany in 1999, now better known as E-CUTZ, where he also works with Erich Schmeier (a.k.a. DJ Errik) and Andre Wevers (a.k.a. DJ Wave). He also has his own radio show, "Get The Kicks" on Afterhours.FM.

Partner: Lara D‘Antonio

Career

Having conceived the DJ team Cosmic Gate, he is a prolific producer with hundreds of tracks to his name. Touring clubs around the globe every weekend, he has established himself as a creative and eclectic producer in the EDM scene.

In 2006, Chagall returned to his roots as a solo producer. His debut single "Monday Bar" was an international breakthrough. It earned him immediate support from renowned DJs such as Tiësto, Paul van Dyk and Armin van Buuren, and the track was in heavy rotation in trance podcasts and radio shows.

His second single "What You Need" became his trademark, blending popular anthemic mixes, progressive trance with prominent rock elements. Thousands of fans attended his DJ sets at the indoor event Trance Energy and the open-air Mysteryland. The tune also inspired a rush of bootlegs, mash-ups and remix-requests that followed its release. 2008 saw the much longed for re-release of "What You Need (The remixes)" with Marco V's version conquering the charts anew. When Chagall's second EP "Sun Red" / "Sky Blue" was released only a few weeks later, he was well-represented on many charts. Djdownload.com, for example, saw him enter the top three straight off.

As a remixer, Chagall has worked on tracks by Armin van Buuren, Markus Schulz, Marcel Woods, Filo & Peri and Wippenberg. Impressed by his work, the band Above & Beyond voted him their producer of the year in 2007. In 2008, he performed at numerous trance festivals worldwide, including Mysteryland, where he played on Tiësto's "In Search of Sunrise" stage.

Unlike some of the trance projects who split, Chagall has kept his ties with Bossi: Cosmic Gate is still together and continue to tour major venues and festivals around the world. He also released in 2009 his single "This Moment" which became a hit in disco clubs and radio shows. He also has his own radio show, "Get The Kicks" on Afterhours.FM. In 2014 he is looking to release his new single and finish tracks for his first solo album.

Discography

Albums

Singles / EPs
 "Sansibar" / "I Don't Know" (2005)
 "Monday Bar" (2006)
 "Borderline" / "Back To San Fran" (2007)
 "What You Need" (2007)
 "Sun Red" / "Sky Blue" (2008)
 "What You Need REMIXES" (2008)
 "This Moment" (2009)
 "Morning Light" (2010)
 "100" (2010)
 "Alone With You" (2011)
 "This Time" (2015)

Remixes
 Wippenberg – "Promisedland" (Nic Chagall Remix) 2007
 Filo & Peri feat. Eric Lumiere – "The Anthem" (Nic Chagall Remix) 2007
 Armin van Buuren – "Sound of Goodbye" (Nic Chagall Drumbeat Edit) 2007
 Marcel Woods – "New Feeling" (Nic Chagall Remix) 2007
 Marcus Schulz – "Cause You Know" (Nic Chagall Remix) 2008
 Dash Berlin – "Man on the Run" (Nic Chagall Remix) 2009
 Marco V – "Coming Back" (Nic Chagall Remix) 2009
 Tiësto – "Here on Earth" (Nic Chagall Remix) 2010
 Susana feat. Josh Gabriel – "Frozen" (Nic Chagall Remix) 2010
 Aruna with Mark Eteson – "Let Go" (Nic Chagall Remix) 2010
 Emma Hewitt – "Rewind" (Nic Chagall Remix) (postponed)

References

External links
 Official radio show

Living people
German record producers
1972 births
Electronic dance music DJs